Jacob "Baby Jake" Matlala (1 August 1962 – 7 December 2013) was a South African boxer and junior flyweight champion from Meadowlands, Johannesburg. He won 4 world championship titles. In 2004, Matlala was voted #72 in the "100 Greatest South Africans" poll organized by SABC.

Death
Jacob Matlala died on 7 December 2013, at the Charlotte Maxeke Johannesburg Academic Hospital.

The former World Boxing Organisation, World Boxing Union (WBU) and International Boxing Association flyweight world champion had been admitted to hospital on numerous occasions over the past few years with complications related to pneumonia.
Johannesburg – Dressed in royal blue and white uniforms and black berets, the New Covenant Church brass band escorted the coffin of boxing legend Jacob "Baby Jake" Matlala into the Rhema Church auditorium.

Trivia
At a height of 1.47 meters, or 4-foot-10, Matlala was the shortest boxing world champion ever. With a total of 68 fights (53 wins and 2 draws), he ended his career with 4 world championships. He presented his WBU belt to Nelson Mandela after his fight to Juan Herrera.

See also
List of flyweight boxing champions
List of light-flyweight boxing champions

References

External links

1962 births
2013 deaths
People from Meadowlands, Gauteng
Flyweight boxers
World flyweight boxing champions
Light-flyweight boxers
World light-flyweight boxing champions
World Boxing Organization champions
Burials at Westpark Cemetery
South African male boxers